In automatic firearms, burst mode or burst-fire is a firing mode enabling the shooter to fire a predetermined number of rounds, usually two or three rounds on hand held weapons and 50-100+ on anti-aircraft weapons and autocannons, with a single pull of the trigger. This firing mode is commonly used in submachine guns and assault rifles. Other types of firearms, such as machine pistols, e.g., the Heckler & Koch VP70 and Beretta 93R and AKM47 also have a burst mode.

The burst mode is normally employed as an intermediate fire mode between semi-automatic and fully automatic, although some firearms lack a "full auto" capability and use a burst mode instead. For instance, the M16A4 (the standard-issue service rifle of the USMC) has, in addition to the semi-automatic mode, a three-round burst mode, which replaced the fully automatic mode of the previous M16A1 and A3 models. The reason for this replacement was the massive waste of ammunition and very poor performance of soldiers who fired their rifles in fully automatic mode during the Vietnam War.

The number of rounds fired in a burst is almost universally determined by a cam mechanism that trips the trigger mechanism for each shot in the burst. Contrary to popular belief, or how it's often represented, squeezing the trigger once does not "commence" the burst. For the vast majority of burst fire weapons, the trigger must be held down for the full duration of the burst. Some designs, as employed on the M16 series, will terminate the burst if the trigger is released before the burst is complete, but keep the cam in position. Thus, the next time the trigger is pulled, the weapon will only fire one or two rounds. Other designs, such as the mechanism found on Heckler & Koch weapons, will reset the cam position. Thus, the next burst will still fire a full number of rounds.

Some firearms, like the AN-94, AO-63 assault rifle and the G11 have a feature in which rounds are fired in quick succession (2-round burst at 1800 rpm in the case of the AN-94). This increases the burst's accuracy, as multiple rounds are fired before the recoil impulse has affected the shooter's aim (before the impulse is even transferred to the shooter, in the case of the G-11). This is performed by having the barrel slide back and receive another round in the chamber pulled by a pulley and is fired as the barrel slams at the bolt, when the first chambered round is fired when the sliding barrel is at rest, as opposed to a cam mechanism of the M16 design.

See also
 Selective fire
 Bump stock, an accessory designed to help simulate full-automatic fire with a semi-automatic firearm

References

Firearm actions